Kim Jae-young (Hangul: 김재영) (born July 22, 1993, in Seoul) is a South Korean pitcher for the Hanwha Eagles of the KBO League.

References 

Hanwha Eagles players
KBO League pitchers
South Korean baseball players
1993 births
Living people